In the 1848 Iowa State Senate elections, Iowa voters elected state senators to serve in the second Iowa General Assembly. Elections were held for 10 of the state senate's 19 seats. State senators serve four-year terms in the Iowa State Senate.

The general election took place in 1848.

Following the previous election in 1846, Democrats had control of the Iowa Senate with 11 seats to Whigs' eight seats.

To claim control of the chamber from Democrats, the Whigs needed to net two Senate seats.

Democrats maintained control of the Iowa State Senate following the 1848 general election with the balance of power remaining unchanged with Democrats holding 11 seats and Whigs having eight seats. Democratic Senator John Jackson Selman was chosen as the President of the Iowa Senate for the second General Assembly.

Summary of Results 
 Note: The holdover Senators not up for re-election are unlisted on this table.

Source:

Detailed Results
NOTE: The Iowa General Assembly does not provide detailed vote totals for Iowa State Senate elections in 1848.

See also
 Elections in Iowa

External links
District boundaries for the Iowa Senate in 1848:
Iowa Senate Districts 1846-1849 map

References

Iowa Senate
Iowa
Iowa Senate elections